Samith de Silva (born 14 February 1989) is a Sri Lankan cricketer. He made his first class debut on 9 December 2016, for Kalutara Physical Culture Club in Tier B of the 2016–17 Premier League Tournament. He made his List A debut on 19 March 2017, for Hambantota District in the 2016–17 Districts One Day Tournament.

References

External links
 

1989 births
Living people
Sri Lankan cricketers
Kalutara Physical Culture Centre cricketers
Hambantota District cricketers
People from Southern Province, Sri Lanka